South Oyster Bay or East Bay is a lagoon and natural harbor along the western portion of the south shore of Long Island in New York in the United States. The harbor is formed by Jones Beach Island, a barrier island on the southern side of Long Island. It is approximately 3 mi (5 km) wide between the two islands, and approximately 15 mi (24 km) long. It links to Great South Bay on its eastern end and opens to the Atlantic Ocean through inlets on either side of Jones Beach Island.

The name refers to its history as one of the finest oyster beds in the world.

See also
Outer Barrier
Jamaica Bay
Oyster Bay, New York
Great South Bay
Patchogue Bay
South Shore Estuary

References

Bays of New York (state)
Oyster Bay (town), New York
Bodies of water of Nassau County, New York
Babylon (town), New York
Bodies of water of Suffolk County, New York